Éric Charbonneau (born July 11, 1969) is a politician from Quebec, Canada. He was an Action démocratique du Québec Member of the National Assembly for the electoral district of Johnson from 2007 to 2008.

Born in Montreal, Quebec, Charbonneau graduated from the Université de Sherbrooke with a bachelor and master's degree in economics. He worked as an economist of the Quebec Ministry of Transportation and the Ministries of Energy and Natural Resources before working in management and planning as well as a foreman before his election in various local companies in the Drummondville and Acton Vale areas in the Bois-Francs region.

Charbonneau was first elected in the 2007 election with 36% of the vote. Parti Québécois incumbent Claude Boucher, finished a close second with 35% of the vote.  Charbonneau took office on April 12, 2007.

He was elected mayor of Acton Vale in 2009.

Footnotes

External links
 

1969 births
Action démocratique du Québec MNAs
Living people
Mayors of places in Quebec
Politicians from Montreal
Université de Sherbrooke alumni
21st-century Canadian politicians